Leptophis stimsoni, commonly known as the grey lora or the Trinidad upland parrot snake, is a small species of snake in the family Colubridae. The species is endemic to the Republic of Trinidad and Tobago.

Geographic range and habitat

Reproduction
L. stimsoni is oviparous.

Etymology
The specific name, stimsoni, is in honor of British herpetologist Andrew Francis Stimson.

References

Further reading
Harding, K.A. (1995). "A new species of tree snake of the genus Leptophis Bell 1825 from Mount Aripo, Trinidad". Tropical Zoology 8 (2): 221–226. (Leptophis stimsoni, new species, p. 222.)

Colubrids
Endemic fauna of Trinidad and Tobago
Reptiles of Trinidad and Tobago
Reptiles described in 1995